Sven (in Danish and Norwegian, also Svend and also in Norwegian most commonly Svein) is a Scandinavian first name which is also used in the Low Countries and German-speaking countries, and is cognate with the English name Swain. The name itself is Old Norse for "young man" or "young warrior". The original spelling in Old Norse was sveinn. 

Many northern European rulers have carried the name including Sweyn I of Denmark (Sven Gabelbart). An old legend relates the pagan king Blot-Sven ordered the execution of the Anglo-Saxon monk Saint Eskil.

In medieval Swedish, "sven" (or "sven av vapen" (sven of arms)) is a term for squire. The female equivalent, Svenja, though seemingly Dutch and Scandinavian, is not common anywhere outside of German-speaking countries. Sven can also be spelled with W, Swen, but is pronounced as Sven.

The Icelandic version of Sven/Svend is Sveinn; the Faroese version is Sveinur.

Entertainment and music
 Sven Einar Englund, Finnish composer
 Sven Epiney, Swiss television, radio host and editor 
 Sven Grünberg, Estonian synthesizer and progressive rock composer and musician 
 Sven August Körling, Swedish composer
 Sven Lõhmus, Estonian composer, producer and lyricist
 Sven Maes, Belgian producer
 Sven Martin, German keyboardist and sound-director
 Sven Regener, German musician and writer
 Sven Sachsalber, Italian performance artist
 Sven-Bertil Taube, Swedish singer and actor
 Sven Väth, German electronic music DJ/producer
 Sven Wollter, Swedish actor
 Svein Berge, Norwegian electronic musician, half of the duo Royksopp

Politics
 Sven Alkalaj, Bosnian politician
 Sven Arrestad, Norwegian temperance campaigner
 Sven Aspling, Swedish politician
 Sven Hulterström, Swedish politician
 Sven Lindgren, Swedish politician
 Sven Otto Littorin, Swedish politician 
 Sven Mikser, Estonian politician
 Sven Ranck, Swedish statesman
 Sven Romanus, Swedish civil servant, Minister for Justice
 Sven Rydenfelt, Swedish economist and political writer
 Sveinn Björnsson, Iceland's first president

Sports
 Sven Andrighetto, Swiss ice hockey player (playing in NHL)
 Sven Axbom, Swedish footballer
 Sven Bartschi, Swiss ice hockey player (playing in NHL Vancouver Canucks)
 Sven Bender, German footballer (playing in Borussia Dortmund)
 Sven Butenschön, German ice hockey player
 Sven Magnus Carlsen, Norwegian chess Grandmaster
 Sven Coster, Dutch sailor
 Sven Davidson, Swedish tennis player
 Sven-Göran Eriksson, Swedish football (soccer) manager
 Sven Fischer, German biathlete
 Sven Habermann, German-Canadian football (soccer) player
 Sven Hannawald, German ski jumper
 Sven Kaldre, Estonian basketball player
 Sven Kramer, Dutch speed skater
 Sven Loll, East German judoka
 Sven Lundgren, Swedish athlete
 Sven Meinhardt, German field hockey player
 Sven Nylander, Swedish hurdler
 Sven Nys, Belgian cyclist
 Sven Ottke, German boxer
 Sven Riederer, Swiss athlete
 Sven Rydell, Swedish footballer
 Sven Schultze, German basketball player 
 Sven Thorgren, Swedish snowboarder
 Sven-Ole Thorsen, Danish actor, stuntman and athlete
 Sven Vermant, Belgian footballer

Other
 Sven Hassel, Danish-born soldier and writer
 Sven Hedin, Swedish explorer and geographer
 Sven O. Høiby, father of Mette-Marit, Crown Princess of Norway
 Sven Jaschan, German computer programmer
 Sven Lidman (clergyman)
 Sven Markelius, Swedish architect
 Sven Nykvist, Swedish cinematographer
 Sven Salander (1894–1965), Swedish Army lieutenant general

Fictional characters
 Sven Hjerson, fictional Finnish detective
 "Svën Höek", an episode of The Ren & Stimpy Show (Swedish)
  Sven Holgersson, fictional character from Voltron franchise
 Sven the Berserk, a character in the 1989 film Erik the Viking, played by Tim McInnerny
 Sven, the silent scorer sometimes appearing on the BBC radio show I'm Sorry I Haven't a Clue
 "Sven from Swiss Cottage" was a character used by Peter Cook when participating in radio phone-ins
 Sven – Rogue Knight, one of the many heroes featured in the custom Warcraft III custom map, Defense of the Ancients and its sequel Dota 2
Sven, a pixie from Álfheim in the Witches of East End novel series by Melissa de la Cruz.
 Sven Dufva, a main character in the poem "Sven Dufva" of The Tales of Ensign Stål, written by J. L. Runeberg 
Sven Cal Bayang, a fictional character from Mobile Suit Gundam SEED C.E. 73: Stargazer
 Sven "The Governator", a character in the movie Cars voiced by Jess Harnell
 Sven, from the Georgia Nicolson book series, by Louise Rennison
 Sven, Kristoff's pet reindeer in the movie Frozen
 Sven, the name of a puffin in Happy Feet Two
 Sven, a Nord character who plays a role in The Elder Scrolls V: Skyrim
 Sven and Ole, a character in a type of joke told by Scandinavian-Americans
 Sven Joergenson, Sven Pilson and Sven Johansson. The three Swedish architects from the series How I Met Your Mother

See also 
 Son
 Swain (name)
 Swen
 Sweyn, a given name
 Swanson (surname)
 Svens
 Svensson (son of Sven)
 Svante (name)
 Svendborg (city in Denmark)
 Swedenborg (Svendberg – surname)

Danish masculine given names
Norwegian masculine given names
Swedish masculine given names
Finnish masculine given names
Estonian masculine given names
German masculine given names
Dutch masculine given names
Swiss masculine given names

is:Sveinn